Hassan Saajin is an Maldivian fisherman, activist known as Zuvaan Masveriya (young fisherman). He has been featured as the brand ambassador by Ooredoo Maldives along with the global brand ambassador Lionel Messi.

Hassan generally raises his voice against the challenges in fishermen lives in Maldives, he has registered a foundation by the name “Dhivehi Masverin”.

President Ibrahim Mohamed Solih has praised his work being done for the fishermen in Maldives and also Hassan encourages youth to go for sustainable fishing Hassan started the campaign #AnhenehVeema (or “Because She’s A Woman”) to raise awareness on the types of hate that women experience online.

Hassan received the Youth Leader of the Year award at the Professional and Career Women Awards 2022, Young Fisherman.

References

Activists
Fishers
Year of birth missing (living people)
Living people